The Caneyville Christian Community is an Anabaptist community, located in Caneyville, Kentucky, living a plain conservative lifestyle, true to the vision of former Old Order Amish bishop Elmo Stoll. G. C. Waldrep classifies them as "para-Amish". Among Anabaptists the community is often simply called "Caneyville".

History 

In 1990 the "Christian Communities" were founded in Cookeville, Tennessee, by Elmo Stoll, a former bishop of the Old Order Amish in Aylmer, Ontario. Stoll's aim was to create a church mostly modeled on the Amish, but with community of goods and without the German language and other obstacles in order to help Christian seekers from a non-plain background to integrate into a very plain, low technology Christian life without materialism. He was successful in establishing a community, but without community of goods, and soon many people from Amish, Old Order Mennonite and German Baptist Brethren backgrounds, but also - as intended - seekers joined his community. In addition, the "Christian Communities" soon spread to other locations in the United States and Canada. Elmo Stoll was the charismatic leader of the communities who held them together. 

After Elmo Stoll's early death in 1998, disunion started among the "Christian Communities". Bryce Geiser, who has a German Baptist background, replaced Elmo Stoll as the leader of the "Christian Communities", but he could not hold together all the different people from different backgrounds. In 2001 the five congregations of the "Christian Communities" announced that they would disband the Cookeville community and the movement as a whole. That led in the end to the disbanding of two of the five "Christian Communities", while two others joined the Noah Hoover Mennonites and one affiliated with an Amish group from Michigan.

In 2004 Bryce Geiser, Andrew Hess and Aaron Stoll, a son of Elmo Stoll, started anew and founded the Christian Community at Caneyville, Kentucky, in order not to give up Elmo Stoll's vision.

Customs and belief 

Caneyville is an Old Order community, meaning that they use horses and buggies instead of cars, dress Plain and do not use electricity, computers, cell phones and other modern conveniences. Internal combustion engines are also not used, but steam engines instead. They use wood stoves, which the community makes, and many things are propane powered, as is the custom among many Amish. The community makes a living mainly from market gardens and the manufacture of wood stoves. They still adhere to Elmo Stoll's vision.

Donnermeyer and Anderson describe the Community as follows:

Population and communities 

There are about 15 families at the Caneyville Christian Community, living on a  property. The members do not all have an Old Order background, but come from Amish, German Baptist Brethren, and "seeker" backgrounds.

Publishing 

A bi-monthly pamphlet, called "Plain Things", is published by the Caneyville Christian Community.

See also
 Believers in Christ, Lobelville
 Hutterite Christian Communities
 Michigan Amish Churches
 Noah Hoover Mennonites
 Orthodox Mennonites

References

Literature
 Jeff Smith: Becoming Amish: A Family's Search for Faith, Community and Purpose, Cedar, MI, 2016, pages 157-176.
 Bryce Geiser: The Christian Communities: A Brotherhood of Covenant and Commitment, in Old Order Notes 20, (Spring Summer 2000), pages 7–22.
 Bryce E. Geiser: What Does SIMPLE LIVING Have To Do With CHRISTIANITY? published by Caneyville Christian Community, 1142 Choncie Lee Road, Caneyville, KY 42721 [without date].
 George Calvin Waldrep: The New Order Amish And Para-Amish Groups: Spiritual Renewal Within Tradition, in The Mennonite Quarterly Review 82 (2008), pages 395-426. 
 Joseph Donnermeyer and Cory Anderson: The Growth of Amish and Plain Anabaptists in Kentucky, in Journal of Amish and Plain Anabaptist Studies 2(2):215, pages 215-244 , 2014. 
 Ira Wagler: The Life of Elmo Stoll: The Shepherd at Dusk: His Vision & Legacy.

Anabaptism in the United States
Christian communities
Grayson County, Kentucky